Järva-Jaani Parish was a rural municipality of Estonia, in Järva County. It had a population of 1,643 (as of 2008) and an area of 126 km² (49 mi²).

Populated places
Järva-Jaani Parish had a borough, Järva-Jaani, and 9 villages:
Jalalõpe
Jalgsema
Kagavere
Karinu
Kuksema
Metsla
Metstaguse
Ramma
Seliküla

References

 
Populated places in Järva County